ACDA may refer to:
 Allegheny County District Attorney
 American Choral Directors Association, a non-profit organization
 Arms Control and Disarmament Agency, an independent agency
 Assured Clear Distance Ahead, a fundamental driving principle
 Thomas Acda (born March 6, 1967), television actor